Mikheil "Miho" Mosulishvili (born December 10, 1962) is a Georgian writer and playwright.

Biography 
Mosulishvili graduated in 1986 from the Tbilisi State University. Afterwards, he worked as a geologist and as a journalist in various newspapers, published several Georgian stories, novels, translations, and plays. His plays were performed in Georgia at theaters, on television and on radio. Some of his works have been translated into Latvian, English, German, Armenian and Russian. His main works are Flight Without a tun and biographical novel Vazha-Pshavela.

The physicist Liguri Mosulishvili was Miho's uncle; and the style of his different thinking had influence on Miho Mosulishvili's creativity.

Works

Books

 My Redbreast, Glosa Publishing, 2015
 Laudakia Caucasia, or A Happy Psychological Portrait of a Century of Wrath, created by Mikhael Tonet’s furniture and by our Tears, Ustari Publishing, 2014
 A Big She-Bear, Saunje Publishing, 2013
 The River of the Soul, Intelekti Publishing, 2012
 From Nowhere to Nowhere, Saunje Publishing, 2012
 Helessa, Ustari Publishing, 2012
 The Mercy Stone, Siesta Publishing, 2011
 Vazha-Pshavela, Pegasi Publishing, 2011
 Almost Picasso and a little bit Bosch, from the Right, Saari Publishing, 2010
 Swans under Snow, Saari Publishing, 2004
 Bendela, Saari Publishing, 2003
 Flight Without a Cask, Bakur Sulakauri Publishing, 2001; Gumbati, 2007, 2011
 The Knight of the Untimely Time, Bestseller Publishing, 1999
 Space in the Vertical, Merani Publishing, 1997
 Frescoes on a Moonlit Day, Merani Publishing, 1990
 The Man of the Forest, Ministry of Culture Collegium, 1988

Drama

 Laudakia Caucasia (2013)
 My Redbreast (2012)
 Vazha-Pshavela Or Seeing Unknown (2012)
 Christmas Goose with Quince (2010)
 Khapra Beetle and House Mouse (2010)
 Dancing with the Dead (2005)
 White Troops (1997)
 Twist of the Border (1995)
 The Wood Man (1988)

Screenplays
 Kakhetian Train (2019), a drama film (35 minutes) directed by Lali Kiknavelidze

Literary prizes and awards
 A first prize in the nomination: 'Best prosaic creative work' by the Gori State Teaching University literary competition Machabeli for the short story 'Jackal's wedding or the sun washes its face', Gori, Georgia, July 22, 2022
 The first prize of literary contest 'Best short story for a teacher' by Georgian Center for Professional Development of Teachers, Information and Educational Resources: the magazine 'Teacher' and Internet newspaper 'mastsavlebeli.ge' for the short story 'For the mustard seeds and for angels', Tbilisi, 2019
 The Georgian National Cinema Centre Prize for Kakutsa film scripts to mark the 100th anniversary of the Georgian Democratic Republic, 2015
 M. Tumanishvili Fund, Tumanishvili Film Actors’ Theatre and Tbilisi Mayor’s Office Cultural Enterprise Centre’s Joint Competition Prize for New Georgian Plays for 2012, for the one-act mythological-ritual play Vazha-Pshavela, or Seeing the Invisible, 2012
 Silver Prize for the Helesa movie-novel (based on synopsis), the Summit Marketing Effectiveness Award. Nomination, Small-Budget, Portland, Oregon, USA, 2012
 Gala (literary prize) for the biographical novel Vazha-Pshavela, 2011
 Khertvisi Literary Competition prize for the story The Night Before, 2007
 Literary competition Formula NLO 2006 prize for the story Alloplant, Athens, Greece, 2006
 Bekar International Literary Competition (for musical compositions), nominated for prize ‘Jazz and Rock Music: Prose’ for the story The Pharisee Council, Moscow, Russia, 2005
  Honor Medal, awarded by President of Georgia N132 (due to the jubilee to the 150th anniversary of the literary magazine Tsiskari), 1998  
 Union of Writers prize for the play The White Army, 1998
 Tbilisi Mayor’s Office, Tbilisi Office for Youth and the Bestseller Union of Booklovers literary competition: first prize for the novel, The Knight of the Untimely Time, 1998
 Georgian Television and Radio Committee Prize for the radio play The Man of the Forest, 1987

References

Resources 
 Literary Articles by Maia Jaliashvili, Tbilisi, Tskarostvali Publishing, 2006,  (in Georgian)
 Twitter Short Story: The River of the Soul By Mikho Mosulishvili
 Intelekti Publishing: Author Mikho Mosulishvili

External links 

 MOSULISHVILI MIKHO
 Mikhobooks
 About The Modern Medea
 MIKHO MOSULISHVILI on the Amazon.com
 MIKHO MOSULISHVILI  (1962 - ) from the playwrights database doollee.com
 The Salamander — Mikho Mosulishvili, translated by Ani mosulishvili, the 'Masque & Spectacle' magazine, June 1, 2017, number 12: Transcaucasia Issue
 Read Poetry: The River of the Soul, by Mikho Mosulishvili
 As Thoughts Aloud - Video-verses by Mikho Mosulishvili, performed by Val Cole, 2020

Works by Miho Mosulishvili
1962 births
Writers from Georgia (country)
Writers from Tbilisi
Male writers from Georgia (country)
Tbilisi State University alumni
Living people
Novelists from Georgia (country)
Memoirists from Georgia (country)
Dramatists and playwrights from Georgia (country)
Screenwriters from Georgia (country)
Translators from Georgia (country)
Geologists from Georgia (country)
20th-century writers from Georgia (country)
21st-century writers from Georgia (country)
Postmodern writers
Magic realism writers
20th-century dramatists and playwrights from Georgia (country)
21st-century dramatists and playwrights from Georgia (country)